Koen Sleeckx (born 20 March 1975) is a Belgian judoka.

Achievements

See also
European Judo Championships
History of martial arts
Judo in Belgium
List of judo techniques
List of judoka
Martial arts timeline

References

1975 births
Living people
Belgian male judoka
Place of birth missing (living people)